Cathedral of the Holy Child may refer to:

 Cathedral of the Holy Child, Manila, the Iglesia Filipina Independiente National Cathedral, Philippines
 Cathedral of the Holy Child, Calapan, seat of the Roman Catholic Apostolic Vicariate of Calapan, Philippines
 Child Jesus Cathedral, Lusaka, Zambia
 Infant Jesus Cathedral, Kollam, India

See also
 Christ Child